East Driefontein is a small gold mining town approximately 20 km outside Carletonville next to West Driefontein.

References

Populated places in the Merafong City Local Municipality